A society is a group of individuals involved in persistent social interaction, or a large social group sharing the same spatial or social territory, typically subject to the same political authority and dominant cultural expectations. Societies are characterized by patterns of relationships (social relations) between individuals who share a distinctive culture and institutions; a given society may be described as the sum total of such relationships among its constituent of members. In the social sciences, a larger society often exhibits stratification or dominance patterns in subgroups.

Societies construct patterns of behavior by deeming certain actions or concepts as acceptable or unacceptable. These patterns of behavior within a given society are known as societal norms. Societies, and their norms, undergo gradual and perpetual changes.

So far as it is collaborative, a society can enable its members to benefit in ways that would otherwise be difficult on an individual basis; both individual and social (common) benefits can thus be distinguished, or in many cases found to overlap. A society can also consist of like-minded people governed by their own norms and values within a dominant, larger society. This is sometimes referred to as a subculture, a term used extensively within criminology, and also applied to distinctive subsections of a larger society.

More broadly, and especially within structuralist thought, a society may be illustrated as an economic, social, industrial or cultural infrastructure, made up of, yet distinct from, a varied collection of individuals. In this regard society can mean the objective relationships people have with the material world and with other people, rather than "other people" beyond the individual and their familiar social environment.

Etymology and usage
The term "society" came from the 12th century French société (meaning 'company'). This was in turn from the Latin word societas, which in turn was derived from the noun socius ("comrade, friend, ally"; adjectival form socialis) used to describe a bond or interaction between parties that are friendly, or at least civil. Without an article, the term can refer to the entirety of humanity (also: "society in general", "society at large", etc.), although those who are unfriendly or uncivil to the remainder of society in this sense may be deemed to be "antisocial". In the 1630s it was used in reference to "people bound by neighborhood and intercourse aware of living together in an ordered community". However, in the 18th century the Scottish economist, Adam Smith taught that a society "may subsist among different men, as among different merchants, from a sense of its utility without any mutual love or affection, if only they refrain from doing injury to each other."

Conceptions
Humans fall between presocial and eusocial in the spectrum of animal ethology. The great apes have always been more (Bonobo, Homo, Pan) or less (Gorilla, Pongo) social animals. According to anthropologist Maurice Godelier, one critical novelty in society, in contrast to humanity's closest biological relatives (chimpanzees and bonobos), is the parental role assumed by the males, which supposedly would be absent in our nearest relatives for whom paternity is not generally determinable.

In sociology 

Sociologist Peter L. Berger defines society as "...a human product, and nothing but a human product, that yet continuously acts ... upon its producer[s]."  According to him, society was created by humans, but this creation turns back and creates or molds humans every day.

Sociologist Gerhard Lenski differentiates societies based on their level of technology, communication, and economy: (1) hunters and gatherers, (2) simple agricultural, (3) advanced agricultural, (4) industrial, and (5) special (e.g. fishing societies or maritime societies). This is similar to the system earlier developed by anthropologists Morton H. Fried, a conflict theorist, and Elman Service, an integration theorist, who have produced a system of classification for societies in all human cultures based on the evolution of social inequality and the role of the state. This system of classification contains four categories:
 Hunter-gatherer bands (categorization of duties and responsibilities). Then came the agricultural society.
 Tribal societies in which there are some limited instances of social rank and prestige.
 Stratified structures led by chieftains.
 Civilizations, with complex social hierarchies and organized, institutional governments.

In addition to this there are:
 Humanity, humankind, upon which rest all the elements of society, including society's beliefs.
 Virtual society, a society based on online identity, which is evolving in the information age.

Over time, some cultures have progressed toward more complex forms of organization and control. This cultural evolution has a profound effect on patterns of community. Hunter-gatherer tribes settled around seasonal food stocks to become agrarian villages. Villages grew to become towns and cities. Cities turned into city-states and nation-states.

Types
Societies are social groups that differ according to subsistence strategies, the ways that humans use technology to provide needs for themselves. Although humans have established many types of societies throughout history, anthropologists tend to classify different societies according to the degree to which different groups within a society have unequal access to advantages such as resources, prestige, or power. Virtually all societies have developed some degree of inequality among their people through the process of social stratification, the division of members of a society into levels with unequal wealth, prestige, or power. Sociologists place societies in three broad categories: pre-industrial, industrial, and postindustrial.

Pre-industrial

In a pre-industrial society, food production, which is carried out through the use of human and animal labor, is the main economic activity. These societies can be subdivided according to their level of technology and their method of producing food. These subdivisions are hunting and gathering, pastoral, horticultural, and agricultural.

Hunting and gathering 

The main form of food production in hunter-gatherer societies is the daily collection of wild plants and the hunting of wild animals. Hunter-gatherers move around constantly in search of food. As a result, they do not build permanent villages or create a wide variety of artifacts, and usually only form small groups such as bands and tribes. However, some hunting and gathering societies in areas with abundant resources (such as the people of Tlingit in North America) lived in larger groups and formed complex hierarchical social structures such as chiefdom. The need for mobility also limits the size of these societies. Bands consist of 15 to 50 people related by kinship. Statuses within the tribe are relatively equal, and decisions are reached through general agreement. The ties that bind the tribe are more complex than those of the bands. Leadership is personal—charismatic—and used for special purposes only in tribal society. There are no political offices containing real power, and a chief is merely a person of influence. The family forms the main social unit, with most members being related by birth or marriage. The anthropologist Marshall Sahlins described hunter-gatherers as the "original affluent society" due to their extended leisure time: adults in foraging and horticultural societies work, on average, about 6.5 hours a day, whereas people in agricultural and industrial societies work on average 8.8 hours a day.

Pastoral 

Pastoralism is a slightly more efficient form of subsistence. Rather than searching for food on a daily basis, members of a pastoral society rely on domesticated herd animals to meet their food needs. Pastoralists live a nomadic life, moving their herds from one pasture to another. Because their food supply is far more reliable, pastoral societies can support larger populations. Since there are food surpluses, fewer people are needed to produce food. As a result, the division of labor (the specialization by individuals or groups in the performance of specific economic activities) becomes more complex. For example, some people become craftworkers, producing tools, weapons, and jewelry, among other items of value. The production of goods encourages trade. This trade helps to create inequality, as some families acquire more goods than others do. These families often gain power through their increased wealth. The passing on of property from one generation to another helps to centralize wealth and power. Over time emerge hereditary chieftainships, the typical form of government in pastoral societies.

Horticultural 

Fruits and vegetables grown in garden plots that have been cleared from the jungle or forest provide the main source of food in a horticultural society. These societies have a level of technology and complexity similar to pastoral societies. Historians use the phrase Agricultural Revolution to refer to the technological changes that occurred as long as 10,000 years ago that led to cultivating crops and raising farm animals. Some horticultural groups use the slash-and-burn method to raise crops. The wild vegetation is cut and burned, and ashes are used as fertilizers. Horticulturists use human labor and simple tools to cultivate the land for one or more seasons. When the land becomes barren, horticulturists clear a new plot and leave the old plot to revert to its natural state. They may return to the original land several years later and begin the process again. By rotating their garden plots, horticulturists can stay in one area for a fairly long period of time. This allows them to build semipermanent or permanent villages. The size of a village's population depends on the amount of land available for farming; thus villages can range from as few as 30 people to as many as 2000.

As with pastoral societies, surplus food leads to a more complex division of labor. Specialized roles in horticultural societies include craftspeople, shamans (religious leaders), and traders. This role specialization allows people to create a wide variety of artifacts. As in pastoral societies, surplus food can lead to inequalities in wealth and power within horticultural political systems, developed because of the settled nature of horticultural life.

Agrarian 

Agrarian societies use agricultural technological advances to cultivate crops over a large area. According to Lenski, the difference between horticultural and agrarian societies is the use of the plow. Increases in food supplies due to improved technology led to larger populations than in earlier communities. This meant a greater surplus, which resulted in towns that became centers of trade supporting various rulers, educators, craftspeople, merchants, and religious leaders who did not have to worry about locating nourishment.

Greater degrees of social stratification appeared in agrarian societies. For example, women previously had higher social status because they shared labor more equally with men. In hunting and gathering societies, women even gathered more food than men. However, as food stores improved and women took on different roles in providing food for the family, men took an increasingly dominant role in society. As villages and towns expanded into neighboring areas, conflicts with other communities inevitably occurred. Farmers provided warriors with food in exchange for protection against invasion by enemies. A system of rulers with high social status also appeared. This nobility organized warriors to protect the society from invasion. In this way, the nobility managed to extract goods from "lesser" members of society.

Industrial

Between the 15th and 16th centuries, a new economic system emerged. Capitalism is marked by open competition in a free market, in which the means of production are privately owned. Europe's exploration of the Americas served as one impetus for the development of capitalism. The introduction of foreign metals, silks, and spices stimulated great commercial activity in European societies.

Industrial societies rely heavily on machines powered by fuels for the production of goods. This produced further dramatic increases in efficiency. The increased efficiency of production of the industrial revolution produced an even greater surplus than before. Now the surplus was not just agricultural goods, but also manufactured goods. This larger surplus caused all of the changes discussed earlier in the domestication revolution to become even more pronounced.

Once again, the population boomed. Increased productivity made more goods available to everyone. However, inequality became even greater than before. The breakup of agricultural-based societies caused many people to leave the land and seek employment in cities. This created a great surplus of labor and gave capitalists plenty of laborers who could be hired for extremely low wages.

Post-industrial

Post-industrial societies are societies dominated by information, services, and high technology more than the production of goods. Advanced industrial societies are now seeing a shift toward an increase in service sectors over manufacturing and production. The United States is the first country to have over half of its workforce employed in service industries. Service industries include government, research, education, health, sales, law, and banking.

Characteristics

Gender 

The division of humans into male and female gender roles has been marked culturally by a corresponding division of norms, practices, dress, behavior, rights, duties, privileges, status, and power. Cultural differences by gender have often been believed to have arisen naturally out of a division of reproductive labor; the biological fact that women give birth led to their further cultural responsibility for nurturing and caring for children. Gender roles have varied historically, and challenges to predominant gender norms have recurred in many societies.

Kinship 

All human societies organize, recognize and classify types of social relationships based on relations between parents, children and other descendants (consanguinity), and relations through marriage (affinity). There is also a third type applied to godparents or adoptive children (fictive). These culturally defined relationships are referred to as kinship. In many societies, it is one of the most important social organizing principles and plays a role in transmitting status and inheritance. All societies have rules of incest taboo, according to which marriage between certain kinds of kin relations are prohibited and some also have rules of preferential marriage with certain kin relations.

Ethnicity

Human ethnic groups are a social category that identifies together as a group based on shared attributes that distinguish them from other groups. These can be a common set of traditions, ancestry, language, history, society, culture, nation, religion, or social treatment within their residing area. Ethnicity is separate from the concept of race, which is based on physical characteristics, although both are socially constructed. Assigning ethnicity to a certain population is complicated, as even within common ethnic designations there can be a diverse range of subgroups, and the makeup of these ethnic groups can change over time at both the collective and individual level. Also, there is no generally accepted definition of what constitutes an ethnic group. Ethnic groupings can play a powerful role in the social identity and solidarity of ethnopolitical units. This has been closely tied to the rise of the nation state as the predominant form of political organization in the 19th and 20th centuries.

Government and politics 

The early distribution of political power was determined by the availability of fresh water, fertile soil, and temperate climate of different locations. As farming populations gathered in larger and denser communities, interactions between these different groups increased. This led to the development of governance within and between the communities. As communities got bigger the need for some form of governance increased, as all large societies without a government have struggled to function. Humans have evolved the ability to change affiliation with various social groups relatively easily, including previously strong political alliances, if doing so is seen as providing personal advantages. This cognitive flexibility allows individual humans to change their political ideologies, with those with higher flexibility less likely to support authoritarian and nationalistic stances.

Governments create laws and policies that affect the citizens that they govern. There have been multiple forms of government throughout human history, each having various means of obtaining power and the ability to exert diverse controls on the population. As of 2017, more than half of all national governments are democracies, with 13% being autocracies and 28% containing elements of both. Many countries have formed international political organizations and alliances, the largest being the United Nations with 193 member states.

Trade and economics

Trade, the voluntary exchange of goods and services, is seen as a characteristic that differentiates humans from other animals and has been cited as a practice that gave Homo sapiens a major advantage over other hominids. Evidence suggests early H. sapiens made use of long-distance trade routes to exchange goods and ideas, leading to cultural explosions and providing additional food sources when hunting was sparse, while such trade networks did not exist for the now extinct Neanderthals. Early trade likely involved materials for creating tools like obsidian. The first truly international trade routes were around the spice trade through the Roman and medieval periods.

Early human economies were more likely to be based around gift giving instead of a bartering system. Early money consisted of commodities; the oldest being in the form of cattle and the most widely used being cowrie shells. Money has since evolved into governmental issued coins, paper and electronic money. Human study of economics is a social science that looks at how societies distribute scarce resources among different people. There are massive inequalities in the division of wealth among humans; the eight richest humans are worth the same net monetary value as the poorest half of all the human population.

Conflict

Humans commit violence on other humans at a rate comparable to other primates, but kill adult humans at a high rate (with infanticide being more common among other animals). It is predicted that 2% of early H. sapiens would be killed, rising to 12% during the medieval period, before dropping to below 2% in modern times.  There is great variation in violence between human populations with rates of homicide in societies that have legal systems and strong cultural attitudes against violence at about 0.01%.

The willingness of humans to kill other members of their species en masse through organized conflict (i.e., war) has long been the subject of debate. One school of thought is that war evolved as a means to eliminate competitors, and has always been an innate human characteristic. Another suggests that war is a relatively recent phenomenon and appeared due to changing social conditions. While not settled, the current evidence suggests warlike predispositions only became common about 10,000 years ago, and in many places much more recently than that. War has had a high cost on human life; it is estimated that during the 20th century, between 167 million and 188 million people died as a result of war.

Contemporary usage
The term "society" is currently used to cover both a number of political and scientific connotations as well as a variety of associations.

Western

The development of the Western world has brought with it the emerging concepts of Western culture, politics, and ideas, often referred to simply as "Western society". Geographically, it covers at the very least the countries of Western Europe, North America, Australia, and New Zealand. It sometimes also includes Eastern Europe, South America, and Israel.

The cultures and lifestyles of all of these stem from Western Europe. They all enjoy relatively strong economies and stable governments, allow freedom of religion, have chosen democracy as a form of governance, favor capitalism and international trade, are heavily influenced by Judeo-Christian values, and have some form of political and military alliance or cooperation.

Information

Although the concept of information society has been under discussion since the 1930s, in the modern world it is almost always applied to the manner in which information technologies have impacted society and culture. It, therefore, covers the effects of computers and telecommunications on the home, the workplace, schools, government, and various communities and organizations, as well as the emergence of new social forms in cyberspace.

One of the European Union's areas of interest is the information society. Here policies are directed towards promoting an open and competitive digital economy, research into information and communication technologies, as well as their application to improve social inclusion, public services, and quality of life.

The International Telecommunication Union's World Summit on the Information Society in Geneva and Tunis (2003 and 2005) has led to a number of policy and application areas where action is envisaged.

Knowledge

As the access to electronic information resources increased at the beginning of the 21st century, special attention was extended from the information society to the knowledge society. An analysis by the Irish government stated, "The capacity to manipulate, store and transmit large quantities of information cheaply has increased at a staggering rate over recent years. The digitisation of information and the associated pervasiveness of the Internet are facilitating a new intensity in the application of knowledge to economic activity, to the extent that it has become the predominant factor in the creation of wealth. As much as 70 to 80 percent of economic growth is now said to be due to new and better knowledge."

See also

 Civil society
 Club (organization)
 Consumer society
 Community (outline)
 Culture (outline)
 Eusociality
 Family
 High society (group)
 Mass society
 Open society
 Outline of society
 Presociality
 Professional society
 Religion (outline)
 Scientific society
 Secret societies
 Sociology 
 Sociobiology
 Social actions
 Social capital
 Social cohesion
 Societal collapse
 Social contract
 Social disintegration
 Social order
 Social solidarity
 Social structure
 Social system
 Social work
 Structure and agency

Notes

References

Further reading

 
 
 
 
 
 
 
 
 
 
 
 
 

 
Humans
Main topic articles